Interstate 470 may refer to:
Interstate 470 (Kansas), a loop around Topeka
Interstate 470 (Missouri), a connection at Kansas City
Interstate 470 (Ohio–West Virginia), a loop around Wheeling, West Virginia
Three highways which are part of what was once proposed as an Interstate 470 around Denver, Colorado:
Colorado State Highway 470
E-470
Northwest Parkway